Keith Hope Shackleton MBE (16 January 1923 – 17 April 2015), born in Weybridge, Surrey, was a British painter who concentrated on landscape views and animals. He has also produced limited edition prints. He was a friend of the conservationist and fellow painter Peter Scott, with whom he travelled to Antarctica. Like Scott, he went to Oundle School. He was also a presenter on the BBC children's television programme Animal Magic and of the Children's ITV series Animals in Action, produced by Anglia Television using footage from its Survival series.

A retrospective exhibition of his "Polar Art", depicting creatures and scenery from both the Arctic and Antarctic was open at the Scott Polar Research Institute in May and June 2007.

Shackleton was appointed Member of the Order of the British Empire (MBE) in the 2012 Birthday Honours for services to the conservation of wildlife.

He died peacefully on 17 April 2015.

References

External links
 Keith Shackleton on artnet
 Art quotations by Keith Shackleton

1923 births
2015 deaths
Animal artists
British landscape painters
British television presenters
Members of the Order of the British Empire
20th-century British painters
British male painters
21st-century British painters
20th-century British male artists
21st-century British male artists
People educated at Oundle School